Events in the year 1940 in Germany.

Incumbents

National level
Head of State and Chancellor

 Adolf Hitler (the Führer) (Nazi Party)

Events

January
 4 January — World War II: (Axis powers): Luftwaffe General Hermann Göring assumes control of most war industries in Germany.
 10 January — World War II: Mechelen Incident: A German plane carrying secret plans for the invasion of western Europe makes a forced landing in Belgium, leading to mobilization of defense forces in the Low Countries.

February
 16 February — World War II: Altmark Incident: The British destroyer  pursues the German tanker Altmark into Jøssingfjord in southwestern Norway.

March
 18 March — World War II: Axis powers: Adolf Hitler and Benito Mussolini meet at Brenner Pass in the Alps and agree to form an alliance against France and the United Kingdom.
 31 March — World War II: Commerce raiding hilfskreuzer Atlantis, leaves the Wadden Sea for what will become the longest warship cruise of the war. (622 days without in-port replenishment or repair)

April
 9 April 
World War II: Germany carries out Operation Weserübung, and invades Denmark and Norway. German forces land in several Norwegian ports and take Oslo; The Norwegian Campaign lasts two months. The Allied campaign in Norway is simultaneously commenced.
German invasion of Norway: German heavy cruiser Blücher is sunk by gunfire and torpedoes from the Norwegian coastal fortress Oscarsborg in the Oslofjord. Of the 2,202 German crew and troops on board, some 830 died (at least 320 of them crewmen). Most either drowned or burnt to death in the flaming oil slick surrounding the wreck.
 20 April - on his 51st birthday, Hitler orders the formation of a new SS regiment, containing Norwegians and Danes as well as Germans.

May
 10 May — World War II: Battle of France begins – German forces invade Low Countries.
 13—14 May — Rotterdam is subjected to savage terror bombing by the Luftwaffe; 980 are killed, and 20,000 buildings destroyed.
 17 May — Brussels falls to German forces.
 20 May
World War II: German forces (2nd Panzer division), under General Rudolf Veiel, reach Noyelles on the English Channel.
Holocaust: The Nazi German concentration and extermination camp Auschwitz-Birkenau, the largest of the German concentration camps, opens in occupied Poland near the town of Oświęcim. Between May 1940 and January 1945, around 1.1 million people were killed there.

June
 3 June
The Holocaust: Nazi leader Franz Rademacher proposes the Madagascar Plan, under which the Jewish population of Europe would be relocated to the island of Madagascar.
World War II: Paris is bombed by the Luftwaffe for the first time.
 10 June — World War II: Norway surrenders to German forces.
 14 June — World War II: Fall of Paris to German occupation.
 15 June — World War II: Verdun falls to German forces.
 17 June — A Luftwaffe Junkers 88 bomber sinks the British ship RMS Lancastria, which was evacuating troops from near Saint-Nazaire, France, killing some 5,800 men. (Wartime censorship prevents the story from becoming public.)
 21 June — World War II: Vichy France and Germany sign an armistice at Compiegne, in the same wagon-lit railroad car used by Marshal Ferdinand Foch to accept the surrender of Germany in 1918.
 23 June — World War II: German leader Adolf Hitler surveys newly defeated Paris in now occupied France.
 30 June — World War II: German forces land in Guernsey, marking the start of the 5-year Occupation of the Channel Islands.

July
 14 July — World War II: Winston Churchill, in a worldwide broadcast, proclaims the intention of Great Britain to fight alone against Germany whatever the outcome.
 19 July — World War II: Adolf Hitler promotes 12 generals to field marshal during the 1940 Field Marshal Ceremony following the swift victory over France, and makes a peace appeal to Britain in an address to the Reichstag. Lord Halifax, British foreign minister, flatly rejects peace terms in a broadcast reply on 22 July.

August
 8 August — World War II: Wilhelm Keitel signs the "Aufbau Ost" directive, which eventually leads to the invasion of the Soviet Union.
 30 August — Second Vienna Award: Germany and Italy compel Romania to cede half of Transylvania to Hungary.

September
 5 September — World War II: Commerce raiding hilfskreuzer Komet enters the Pacific Ocean via the Bering Strait after crossing the Arctic Ocean from the North Sea with the help of Soviet icebreakers Lenin, Stalin, and Kaganovich.
 7 September — World War II: The Blitz – Germany begins to rain bombs on London (the first of 57 consecutive nights of strategic bombing).
 22 September — First flight of Heinkel He 280
 27 September — World War II: Germany, Italy and Japan sign the Tripartite Pact.

October
 18–19 October — World War II: Thirty-two ships are sunk from Convoy SC 7 and Convoy HX 79 by the most effective wolfpack of the war including Kretschmer, Prien and Schepke.

November
 11 November — World War II: The German Hilfskreuzer (commerce raider) Atlantis captures top secret British mail, and sends it to Japan.
 14 November — World War II: The city of Coventry, England is destroyed by 500 German Luftwaffe bombers (150,000 fire bombs, 503 tons of high explosives, and 130 parachute mines level 60,000 of the city's 75,000 buildings; 568 people are killed).
 16 November — World War II: In response to Germany levelling Coventry 2 days before, the Royal Air Force begins to bomb Hamburg (by war's end, 50,000 Hamburg residents will have died from Allied attacks).
 18 November — World War II: German leader Adolf Hitler and Italian Foreign Minister Galeazzo Ciano meet to discuss Benito Mussolini's disastrous invasion of Greece.

December
 12 December & 15 December — World War II: "Sheffield Blitz" – The City of Sheffield is badly damaged by German air-raids.
 16 December — World War II: Operation Abigail Rachel – RAF bombing of Mannheim.
 29 December — World War II: Luftwaffe carries out a massive incendiary bombing raid on London, UK, starting 1,500 fires. Many famous buildings, including the Guildhall and Trinity House, are either damaged or destroyed.

Date unknown 
 In 1940, German optometrist Heinrich Wöhlk invented plastic Contact lenses.
 hülsta (hülsta-werke Hüls GmbH & Co. KG), a German  furniture manufacturer is founded in Stadtlohn.

Births
4 January — Helmut Jahn, German architect (died 2021)
16 January — Franz Müntefering, German politician
23 January - Armin Maiwald, German author, television director and producer
24 January — Joachim Gauck, President of Germany
28 January - Bernd Klingner, German sport shooter
31 January - Werner Franke, German biologist (died 2022)
9 February — Hubert Burda, German publisher
17 February
 Willi Holdorf, German athlete
 Winfried Hassemer, German judge (died 2014)
20 February - Christoph Eschenbach, German conductor
2 March — Lothar de Maizière, German politician
4 March — Wolfgang Hoffmann-Riem, German judge
7 March — Rudi Dutschke, German radical student leader (died 1979)
17 March — Gottfried Münzenberg, German chemist
21 March — Paul Friedrichs German motocross racer (died 2012)
26 March — Victor von Halem, German operatic bass (died 2022)
22 April — Berndt Seite, German politician
3 May — Conny Plank, German musician (died 1987)
11 June — Volkmar Sigusch, German sexologist, physician and sociologist
15 June — Franz Wegner, German physicist
20 June — Eugen Drewermann, German theologian
21 June — Brigitte Boehme, German lawyer and church administrator in Bremen
25 June — Peer Augustinski, German actor and comedian (died 2014)
7 July 
Wolfgang Clement, German politician (died 2020)
Rosel Zech, German actress (died 2011)
27 July — Pina Bausch, German choreographer (died 2009)
7 August — Martin Heisenberg, German neurobiologist
9 August — Marie-Luise Marjan, German actress
13 August — Dirk Sager, German journalist (died 2014)
15 August — Dietmar Schwager, German football player (died 2018)
25 September — Werner Münch, German politician
27 September — Rudolph Moshammer, German fashion designer (died 2005)
26 October — Tilo Prückner, German actor
29 October — Heinrich Mussinghoff, German bishop of Roman Catholic Church
2 November — Carolin Reiber, German television presenter
15 November — Klaus Ampler, German cyclist (died 2016)
22 November — Frank Duval, German composer, conductor, songwriter and singer
24 November — Hermann Otto Solms, German politician
7 December — Klaus Tschira, German entrepreneur (died 2015)
12 December — Ulla Wiesner, German singer
18 December — Klaus Wennemann, German actor (died 2000)
22 December — Eberhard Schöler, German table tennis player
29 December — Brigitte Kronauer, German writer
30 December — Renate Jaeger, German judge

Deaths
2 January — Albert Richter, German cyclist (born 1912)
2 February — Carl Grünberg, German philosopher (born 1861)
9 February — William Dodd, United States Ambassador to Germany from 1933 to 1937, historian and author (born 1869)
27 February — Peter Behrens, German architect (born 1868)
29 February — Josef Swickard, German actor (born 1866)
3 March — Karl Muck, German conductor (born 1859)
15 March — Robert Leffler, German actor and singer (born 1866)
20 March — Alfred Ploetz, German physician, biologist, and eugenicist (born 1860)
25 April 
Otto Hintze, German historian (born 1861)
Wilhelm Dörpfeld, German architect and archaeologist (born 1853)
26 April — Carl Bosch, German chemist and Nobel Prize laureate (born 1874)
26 May — Prince Wilhelm of Prussia (born 1906)
6 June — Arthur Zimmermann, German diplomat (born 1864)
22 June — Walter Hasenclever, German poet and playwright (born 1890)
5 July — Friedrich Robert von Beringe, German army officer (born 1865)
19 July — Max Bodenheimer, lawyer (born 1865)
21 July — Elisabeth von Eicken, painter (born 1862)
1 August — Paul Hirsch, German politician (born 1868)
24 August — Paul Nipkow, German technician and inventor (born 1860)
26 September — Walter Benjamin, German philosopher and cultural critic (born 1892)
11 October – Adolf von Trotha, German admiral (born 1868)
28 November — Helmut Wick, wing commander in the Luftwaffe (born 1915)
1 December — Johann Viktor Bredt, German jurist and politician (born 1879)
3 December — Wolff von Stutterheim, Wehrmacht general and Knight's Cross recipient (born 1893)
11 December — Fritz Erler, German painter (born 1868)

References

Further reading
 Bloch, Leon Bryce and Lamar Middleton, ed. The World Over in 1940 (1941) detailed coverage of world events online free; 914pp

 
Years of the 20th century in Germany
Germany
Germany